The XL Bermuda Open is a defunct tennis tournament played in 1993 and from 1995 until 2008 on clay courts. The event has been held annually in Paget in Bermuda and was part of the ATP Challenger Tour. It was part of the ATP World Tour in 1995 and 1996.

Hernán Gumy and Flávio Saretta were the title holders in singles, with two win each.

Mark Knowles, Doug Flach and Richey Reneberg were the record holders on doubles titles with two victories each one. The last two as partners.

Results

Key

Singles

Doubles

See also
 List of tennis tournaments
 Bermuda Open (1879-1976), tennis tournament founded as the Bermuda Open Tennis Championships.

External links
 Official website

Defunct tennis tournaments in Bermuda
 
Tennis tournaments in Bermuda
Clay court tennis tournaments
ATP Challenger Tour
ATP Tour
1995 establishments in Bermuda
Recurring sporting events established in 1995